Robert Charles MacKinnon Jr. (born September 24, 1960) is an American basketball coach.  He is the interim head coach of the Raleigh Firebirds of The Basketball League.

Previously, he served as the head coach of the Colorado 14ers, Springfield Armor, Los Angeles D-Fenders, and Texas Legends in the NBA G League.

Coaching career
Mackinnon began his coaching career in 1982 as an assistant coach for his alma mater King's College. He then had stints as an assistant coach at several different colleges and universities including Mercyhurst College, George Washington University, University of Notre Dame and University of North Carolina. He was also head coach at the United States Merchant Marine Academy for two seasons during which he led the team to the NCAA Tournament Division III tournament twice and won coach of the year in 1999. Beginning in 2008, he was a head coach mostly in the NBA D-League/G League except for one season in China.

Personal life
Mackinnon's father Bob MacKinnon (December 5, 1927 – July 7, 2015) was an American collegiate and professional basketball coach. He coached three different professional teams in his career: the American Basketball Association's Spirits of St. Louis, and the NBA's Buffalo Braves and New Jersey Nets. He also served as the Nets' general manager. He died in Williamsville, New York on July 7, 2015, at the age of 87. Mackinnon Jr. also has four sisters.

References

1960 births
Living people
American expatriate basketball people in China
American men's basketball coaches
American men's basketball players
Basketball coaches from New York (state)
Basketball players from New York (state)
College men's basketball head coaches in the United States
College men's basketball players in the United States
Colorado 14ers coaches
George Washington Colonials men's basketball coaches
Idaho Stampede coaches
King's College (Pennsylvania) alumni
Los Angeles D-Fenders coaches
Marshall Thundering Herd men's basketball coaches
Merchant Marine Mariners men's basketball coaches
Niagara Purple Eagles men's basketball coaches
North Carolina Tar Heels men's basketball coaches
Notre Dame Fighting Irish men's basketball coaches
Sportspeople from Buffalo, New York
Springfield Armor coaches
Texas Legends coaches